Kiswarani (Aymara kiswara Buddleja incana, -ni a suffix to indicate ownership, "the one with kiswara", hispanicized spelling Quishuarani) is a mountain in the Andes of Peru, about  high. It is located in the Apurímac Region, Antabamba Province, Sabaino District, and in the Aymaraes Province, Caraybamba District. Kiswarani lies southeast of Pisti.

References 

Mountains of Peru
Mountains of Apurímac Region